Malka Silberstein (November 15, 1903, Vilnius, Russian Empire – 1941, Hiiumaa, Estonia) was one of the first lawyers in the Republic of Estonia. The young and successful wheelchair lawyer, with her long red hair, was a striking figure in Estonia during the interwar years. In the late 1920s, she was involved with two lawyers for the abolition of the death penalty in the Estonian Penal Code.
After 1940, she went on to be a controversial figure, working for the People's Commissariat for Internal Affairs (NKVD). She was executed by the NKVD in September 1941 during the Soviet retreat from Estonia.

References

Estonian women lawyers
Lawyers from Vilnius
1903 births
1941 deaths
20th-century Estonian lawyers
20th-century Estonian women
20th-century women lawyers
Estonian people executed by the Soviet Union